Morrill Hall, on the campus of Iowa State University, is a historic building that now houses the Christian Petersen Art Museum.

It was named for Justin Smith Morrill, who created the Morrill Land-Grant Colleges Act.  Construction was completed in 1891 with less than $30,000.  Morrill Hall was originally constructed to fill the capacity of a library, museum, and chapel.  These original uses are engraved in the exterior stonework on the east side.

It was vacated starting in 1996 when it was determined unsafe.  Also in 1996, Morrill Hall was listed on the National Register of Historic Places.  In 2005, $9 million was raised to renovate the building and convert it into a museum.  Morrill Hall has reopened as of March 2007, including the new Christian Petersen Art Museum.

The building has 27,172 square feet.

Chimneys at the four corners are designed to provide draft for natural ventilation, unlike most chimneys (which exhaust products of burning).

See also
Campus of Iowa State University#Current buildings
Morrill Hall, Cornell University
Morrill Hall, University of Nevada, Reno

References

University and college buildings on the National Register of Historic Places in Iowa
Romanesque Revival architecture in Iowa
School buildings completed in 1891
Iowa State University buildings and structures
National Register of Historic Places in Story County, Iowa
1891 establishments in Iowa